Gavin Vlijter (born 12 February 1997) is a Surinamese football player who plays as a winger for Dutch club De Treffers.

Club career
He made his professional debut in the Eerste Divisie for Fortuna Sittard on 13 March 2015 in a game against Sparta Rotterdam.

On 4 June 2020, he moved to De Treffers.

References

External links
 

1997 births
Sportspeople from Paramaribo
Living people
Surinamese footballers
Dutch footballers
Dutch sportspeople of Surinamese descent
Fortuna Sittard players
MVV Maastricht players
De Treffers players
Eredivisie players
Eerste Divisie players
Tweede Divisie players
Association football wingers